One-Two, Soldiers Were Going... is a 1977 Soviet war film directed by Leonid Bykov.

Plot 
A small station Podbednya no different from many other stations of the Soviet Union. During the great Patriotic war there were fierce battles. And now here come the relatives of those who approached the Victory, but did not live up to it.

In the movie "One-Two, Soldiers Were Going..." shows two parallel storylines. The first develops in the mid-1970s, the second — in the spring of 1944. By the end of the movie lines are closed on the battlefield, which takes place on March 18, 1944 and the memory of which honor the audience on March 18, 1974.

Cast 
Leonid Bykov as Viktor Svyatkin
Vladimir Konkin as Igor Suslin
Yelena Shanina as Kima Velenstovich    
Bohdan Beniuk as Krynkin    
Ivan Havryliuk as Sgt Ivan Saiko, ″Baltika″    
Otabek Ganiyev as Khabarbekov
Vladimir Gerasimov as Vladimir Myatnikov, "Philosopher"
Nikolai Sektimenko as Glebov
Vano Yantbelidze as Vano Koderidze
Leonid Bakshtayev as Konstantin
Yevgeniya Uralova as Anna, Suslin and Kima's daughter
Nikolai Grinko as colonel, Konstantin's commander 
Mikhail Yezepov as singer Michael, Myatnikov's son
Natalya Naum as Valentina Ivanovna
Boris Khimichev as Yuri Ivanovich, Saiko's son
Yuriy Sherstnyov as Glebov's nephew
Aida Yunusova as Yunes, Khabarbekov's daughter
Yevhen Paperny as Konstantin's colleague (uncredited)

References

External links 

1977 films
1970s war drama films
Films based on works by Boris Vasilyev
Russian war drama films
Soviet war drama films
Soviet black-and-white films
Dovzhenko Film Studios films
Eastern Front of World War II films
Russian-language Ukrainian films
1977 drama films
Russian black-and-white films
Russian World War II films
Soviet World War II films
Ukrainian World War II films